Burhaniye National Forces Culture Museum is a museum in Burhaniye district of Balıkesir Province in western Turkey.

Location
Burhaniye is an ilçe (district) of Balıkesir Province. The museum is at

History
The museum is housed in an 18th-century building. During the Ottoman Empire era, a part of the ground floor was used as a coffeehouse and another part as a hardware store. The upper floor served as a hotel. During the Turkish War of Independence, the building was turned into the headquarters of the local militia forces. During the early years of the Turkish Republic, it was used as a Halkevi building and later an officers club.

Burhaniye Municipality restored the building and opened it as a museum on 24 November 2008.

Exhibited items
Although the name of the museum refers to War of Independence, the museum is an archaeology and ethnography museum. The ground floor is the archaeology section. Most of the items are Adramyttion finds, which were granted by Özkan Arıkantürk. There is also a trireme ship. In the section of coinage and ceramics, tweezers, brooch, earring, necklace and pins are also exhibited. In another section, glass articles such as unguentarium (eye drop bottle) are also exhibited.

References

Buildings and structures in Balıkesir Province
Archaeological museums in Turkey
Ethnographic museums in Turkey
Historic house museums in Turkey
2008 establishments in Turkey
Museums established in 2008